Nannocyrtopogon is a genus of robber flies in the family Asilidae. There are at least 20 described species in Nannocyrtopogon.

Species
These 28 species belong to the genus Nannocyrtopogon:

 Nannocyrtopogon antennatus Wilcox and Martin, 1957 i c g
 Nannocyrtopogon aristatus James, 1942 i c g b
 Nannocyrtopogon arnaudi Wilcox and Martin, 1957 i c g
 Nannocyrtopogon atripes Wilcox & Martin, 1936 i c g b
 Nannocyrtopogon bruneri Wilcox and Martin, 1957 i c g
 Nannocyrtopogon cerussatus (Osten Sacken, 1877) i c g
 Nannocyrtopogon crumbi Wilcox and Martin, 1957 i c g
 Nannocyrtopogon deserti Wilcox and Martin, 1957 i c g
 Nannocyrtopogon howlandi Wilcox and Martin, 1957 i c g
 Nannocyrtopogon inyoi Wilcox & Martin, 1957 i c g b
 Nannocyrtopogon irvinei Wilcox & Martin, 1957 i c g b
 Nannocyrtopogon jbeameri Wilcox and Martin, 1957 i g
 Nannocyrtopogon lestomyiformis Wilcox and Martin, 1936 i c g
 Nannocyrtopogon mingusi Wilcox and Martin, 1957 i c g
 Nannocyrtopogon minutus Wilcox and Martin, 1936 i c g
 Nannocyrtopogon monrovia Wilcox and Martin, 1936 i c g
 Nannocyrtopogon neoculatus Wilcox and Martin, 1957 i c g
 Nannocyrtopogon nevadensis Wilcox and Martin, 1957 i c g
 Nannocyrtopogon nigricolor (Coquillett, 1904) i c g
 Nannocyrtopogon nitidus Wilcox and Martin, 1957 i c g
 Nannocyrtopogon oculatus Wilcox and Martin, 1936 i c g
 Nannocyrtopogon richardsoni Wilcox and Martin, 1957 i c g
 Nannocyrtopogon sequoia Wilcox and Martin, 1957 i g
 Nannocyrtopogon stonei Wilcox and Martin, 1957 i c g
 Nannocyrtopogon timberlakei Wilcox and Martin, 1957 i c g
 Nannocyrtopogon tolandi Wilcox and Martin, 1957 i c g
 Nannocyrtopogon vanduzeei Wilcox & Martin, 1936 i c g b
 Nannocyrtopogon vandykei Wilcox and Martin, 1957 i c g

Data sources: i = ITIS, c = Catalogue of Life, g = GBIF, b = Bugguide.net

References

Further reading

 
 
 

Asilidae genera
Articles created by Qbugbot